
Pajęczno County is a unit of territorial administration and local government (powiat) in Łódź Voivodeship, central Poland. It came into being on January 1, 1999, as a result of the Polish local government reforms passed in 1998.

As of 2006 its total population is 53,395, out of which the population of Pajęczno is 6,674, that of Działoszyn is 6,276, and the rural population is 40,445.

Neighbouring counties
Pajęczno County is bordered by Bełchatów County to the north-east, Radomsko County to the east, Częstochowa County and Kłobuck County to the south, and Wieluń County to the west.

Administrative division
The county is subdivided into eight gminas (two urban-rural and six rural). These are listed in the following table, in descending order of population.

References
Polish official population figures 2006

 
Land counties of Łódź Voivodeship